The 2022–23 Women's National Cricket League season was the 27th season of the Women's National Cricket League, the women's domestic limited overs cricket competition in Australia. The tournament ran from 23 September 2022 to 25 February 2023.

On 29 June 2022, Cricket Australia announced the fixtures for the tournament; a total of 43 matches will be played, with each of the seven teams playing each other team twice. Tasmania were the defending champions.

Tasmania won the competition, their second WNCL title, beating South Australia in the rain-affected final. During the very last over of the final, described by news.com.au as "[o]ne of the craziest finishes in cricket", Tasmania took five wickets for two runs, to win the match by just one run (DLS method).

Ladder

Fixtures

Round 1

Round 2

Round 3

Round 4

Round 5

Final

Statistics

Highest totals

Most runs

Most wickets

References

Bibliography

External links
 WNCL 2022–23 on cricket.com.au
 Tournament home at ESPN Cricinfo

Women's National Cricket League seasons
 
Women's National Cricket League